Clinton (formerly, Sarahville, Sarahsville, and Lincoln) is a small town in Amador County, California. Clinton was the center of a placer mining community during the 1850s and of quartz mining as late as the 1880s. This town once decided Amador County elections as its votes were always counted last. Clinton is registered as a California Historical Landmark. A post office operated at Clinton from 1856 to 1859. Nowadays, Clinton is a picturesque little town made up of an assemblage of homes and historic buildings around the center of town. It has a population of about 45.

References

Unincorporated communities in California
Unincorporated communities in Amador County, California
California Historical Landmarks